Kambium Elijah "Kam" Buckner (born May 12, 1985)  is an American politician and attorney who serves as a Democratic member of the Illinois House of Representatives from the 26th district. The district, located entirely in Chicago, includes neighborhoods such as Bronzeville, Downtown, Gold Coast, and Hyde Park, among others. Buckner is the chair of the Illinois House Black Caucus. In college, he played football for the Illinois Fighting Illini football team as an offensive tackle and defensive lineman.

He was a candidate in the 2023 Chicago mayoral election, but lost in the first round.

Early life and education
Buckner was raised on the South Side of Chicago, and attended Morgan Park High School. He earned an undergraduate degree from the University of Illinois at Urbana–Champaign, where he played for the Illinois Fighting Illini football team and was a teammate of future NFL players Vontae Davis, Kelvin Hayden, Pierre Thomas, and Rashard Mendenhall. While at the University of Illinois he became a member of Omega Psi Phi. Buckner later earned a J.D. degree from the DePaul University College of Law.

Early career 
Buckner began his political career as an aide to Senator Dick Durbin in Washington D.C. from 2007 until 2012 and as an advisor to Mayor Mitch Landrieu in New Orleans from 2012 through 2013. He then worked in community and neighborhood relations for the Chicago Cubs from 2013 until 2015. In 2015, he was appointed Executive Director of World Sport Chicago, a nonprofit that grew from the Chicago bid for the 2016 Summer Olympics.

On January 8, 2017, Governor Bruce Rauner appointed Buckner to the Board of Trustees of Chicago State University for a term expiring January 15, 2023.

Buckner has taught at University of Chicago and has been a contributor for The Hill and Crain's Chicago Business. As of 2023, he also serves as vice president of governmental affairs for Outfront Media.

Illinois House of Representatives (2019-present) 
On January 18, 2019, Buckner was appointed to the Illinois House of Representatives to succeed Christian Mitchell, who left to become a deputy governor in the J.B. Pritzker administration. In the 2020 election, he was re-elected unopposed to a two-year term. In December 2020, he was elected as chairman of the Illinois House Black Caucus.

In 2023, Edward Robert McClelland of Chicago magazine wrote that, during the 2021–2022 Illinois General Assembly, Buckner played a role in the passage of some of the "most significant legislation", citing his role in the passage of the SAFE-T Act and legislation which will transform the Chicago Board of Education into an elected school board. In 2023, A.D. Quig characterized Buckner as an active member of the Illinois House of Representatives, writing that Buckner,

Committee assignments 
As of July 3, 2022, Representative Buckner is a member of the following Illinois House committees:
Commercial & Property Subcommittee (HJUA-COMM)
Executive Committee (HEXC)
Higher Education Committee (HHED)
Judiciary - Civil Committee (JHUA)
Judiciary - Criminal Committee )HJUC)
Tourism Committee (SHTO)

2023 Chicago mayoral campaign 

On May 12, 2022, Buckner announced that he would run for mayor of Chicago in the 2023 election. He said that his campaign would focus on the issues of "public safety, public education, equitable economic development and sustainable budgeting." 

In the initial round of the election, Buckner was defeated, placing seventh of nine candidates with just over 11,000 votes (1.96% of the election's overall vote).

Buckner endorsed Brandon Johnson in the election's runoff.

Political positions 
Buckner regards himself to be a "pro-business progressive" Democrat.

Education
In his time in the Illinois General Assembly Buckner has constantly advocated for equitable funding of public schools across Illinois. Buckner authored HB 3917 to ensure that Chicago Public Schools receive the proper amount of funding based on the need of the students in the district. The legislation amends the evidence-based funding provisions of the School Code and provides that funds received by the Chicago school district for low-income, English learner, and special education resources must be distributed to every school of the district in the appropriate amount specified under the Essential Elements component of the funding formula.

He has been a proponent of Science, Technology, Engineering and Mathematics education in low-income neighborhoods and co-sponsored legislation to create an elected representative school board in Chicago.

Consumer protection
Buckner is the primary sponsor of House Bill 3920 that would make it illegal in Illinois for financial institutions to mail unsolicited, predatory, high-interest loan checks to consumers. This legislation is similar to the Unsolicited Loan Act of 2018, introduced in the U.S. Senate by Senators Doug Jones (D-AL), Tom Cotton (R-AR), and Jeff Merkley (D-OR).

Civil liberties
In July 2019, it came to light that the Chicago Police Department had been running secret background checks on members of the public who signed up to give comments at meetings of the Chicago Police Board. Police scoured lists of public speakers at board meetings and ran their names through department databases to look for arrest records, prison records, outstanding warrants, or sex offender registrations. In some cases, police even look at voter registration records and websites such as Facebook, Twitter, LinkedIn, or YouTube where speakers had profiles.

Police compiled this data into profiles on each speaker, many of whom were openly critical of the CPD. One woman profiled by the CPD had alleged to the Police Board that she had been sexually assaulted by a CPD officer years previously. Others were relatives of individuals who had been killed in shootings involving CPD officers. Records compiled by the Chicago Tribune show that this practice dated back to 2006 and led to secret background checks of more than 300 citizens—all without the knowledge or consent of those individuals.

In October 2019, Buckner filed HB 3925 that would make it illegal for law enforcement departments throughout the state to conduct background checks on citizens giving public comment at open meetings. The legislation would amend the Illinois Open Meetings Act to render such background checks a felony act.

Buckner was the House sponsor of Senate Bill 1599 which was sponsored by Elgie Sims in the Illinois Senate. It amended the Consumer Fraud and Deceptive Business Practices Act in relation to the dissemination of criminal record information. It made it an unlawful practice for a person or entity that publishes for profit a person's criminal record information to fail to correct an error in the individual's criminal record information. Governor J.B. Pritzker signed it into law on August 20, 2019, making it Public Act 101-0431.

Buckner has also been an outspoken opponent of Red Light and speed cameras, saying that they fundamentally run afoul of due process, the right to face one's accuser and privacy. He has also spoken out about the influx of these cameras in minority and poverty stricken neighborhoods and House Bill 3927, introduced by Buckner, amends the Illinois Vehicle Code and makes these automated traffic law enforcement systems illegal.

Buckner introduced House Bill 3584 in January 2019. It provides that victim impact statements received by Parole Boards shall be confidential and shall not be discoverable in litigation. It also amended the Open Parole Hearings Act to prevent the release of any material to the inmate, the inmate's attorney, any third party, or any other person that contains any information from the victim who has provided a victim impact statement, including the name and or address of the victim. Governor J.B. Pritzker signed it into law August 9, 2019, making it Public Act 101-0288.

Gun control
Buckner has been a vocal advocate for comprehensive gun control. He has used his personal history of experiencing and witnessing gun violence from a very young age to demand that mental health, quality of life, education and economic development be factors in any public policy efforts to eradicate gun violence.

Environment
In 2019 Buckner was rated a 100% by the Illinois Environmental Council.

Protecting women and girls
In 2019 a Chicago Tribune special report revealed 55 unsolved killings of women in the Chicago area and a great number of missing women. The Illinois State Police came under fire for the massive backlog in processing DNA in murder cases and the FBI was asked to investigate any correlation between the reported occurrences. Buckner took to the floor of the Illinois General Assembly in May 2019 to address the disappearance of 3 Chicago women, 2 of whom were pregnant and later found murdered. In October 2019, Buckner authored and introduced House Bill 3932 which would create the Task Force on Missing and Murdered Chicago Women Act.

Personal life 
Buckner comes from a musical family. His father was the lead singer in a 1970s soul group that was signed to Hugh Hefner's Playboy Records. He is a cousin of singer and actress Jennifer Hudson and the Staples Singers. Buckner was arrested and pled guilty to driving under the influence (DUI) in 2010. In 2019, he was arrested for DUI and pled guilty. He was sentenced to 12 months of conditional discharge.

Buckner is married to Bernadette Salgado-Buckner, and they have a son.

Electoral history

State representative

Mayor

References

External links

 Official profile at Illinois General Assembly

1985 births
21st-century African-American politicians
21st-century American politicians
African-American state legislators in Illinois
American athlete-politicians
Chicago State University people
Democratic Party members of the Illinois House of Representatives
DePaul University College of Law alumni
Illinois Fighting Illini football players
Living people
Players of American football from Chicago
Politicians from Chicago